The  is an armored artillery vehicle in the exclusive use of the Japan Ground Self-Defense Force. Self-propelled howitzers are employed to provide mobile heavy fire support to army units in the field.

The Type 75 shares a number of automotive components with the Type 74 105 mm self-propelled howitzer, which was developed during the same time. Mitsubishi Heavy Industries developed the chassis, which was based on the Type 73 Armored Personnel Carrier, while the howitzer and turret were designed by Japan Steel Works. Two prototypes were completed in 1971–72 and differed only in their loading systems. Trials were conducted 1973–74 and the howitzer was accepted for service in October 1975. It carries 28 rounds of ammunition on board.

As of 2001 Japan reported to the United Nations Office for Disarmament Affairs that 201 Type 75s were in service. Starting in 1999, it was gradually replaced by the Type 99 155 mm self-propelled howitzer. As of December 2008 it still equipped the 5th, 11th, 171st and 172nd Field Artillery Battalions.

All Type 75s were decommissioned by 2016.

Similar vehicles
 M109 howitzer

Notes

References
 Chant, Christopher. A Compendium of Armaments and Military Hardware. New York and London: Routledge & Kegan Paul, 1987 , p. 76

External links
 Type 75 on globalsecurity.org
 Type 75 on OnWar.com
 Excerpt from Jane's Armour and Artillery 2008

Japan Ground Self-Defense Force
155 mm artillery
Tracked self-propelled howitzers
Self-propelled howitzers of Japan
Military vehicles introduced in the 1970s